The 2022–23 Biathlon World Cup – Stage 5 was the fifth event of the season and was held in Ruhpolding, Germany, from 11 to 15 January 2023.

Schedule of events 
The events took place at the following times.

Medal winners

Men

Women

References 

Biathlon World Cup - Stage 5, 2022-23
2022–23 Biathlon World Cup
Biathlon World Cup - Stage 5
Biathlon competitions in Germany